Sisters of the Valley is a small business that sells cannabidiol tinctures, cannabidiol infused oil, and cannabidiol salves, for oral and topical use, made with ethanol and coconut oil, via their website and the craft e-commerce website Etsy. It is based in Merced, California, and its proprietors follow a monastic motif.

History
In 2015, the sales of the Sisters of the Valley's CBD products reached $6,000,000. Early on the business, the company was banned from advertising on Facebook, and started focusing its communications effort on PR.

In 2017, the sales of the CBD-related products reached $25.1 million.

Description
Following practices of biodynamic agriculture, workers regulate their operations by the cycles of the moon, starting two-week production intervals upon the new moon, during which time they also practice chastity and vegetarianism.

The owner and "lead Sister" Christine Meeusen, who does not identify with Christianity, considers the production to be a spiritual activity, whose rituals and incorporate New Age practices and environmentalism, borrowing from "Native American" practices. Meeusen also mentions the Beguines to refer to her business' philosophy.

The members wear religious habits and refer to each other as sisters, but claim no affiliation with a religious order.

Business Insider calls the Sisters of the Valley nuns "the most talked-about women in the pot business".

See also 
Christine Meeusen (owner)
Beguines and Beghards

References

Further reading 
 http://www.racked.com/2016/4/20/11459612/sisters-of-the-valley-weed-nuns
 http://www.thedailybeast.com/articles/2016/01/24/sister-kate-the-vegan-pot-loving-feminist-behind-etsy-s-cannabidiol-shop.html
 https://www.wired.com/2016/04/shaughn-crawford-john-dubois-sisters-of-the-valley/
 https://www.mirror.co.uk/news/world-news/nuns-growing-cannabis-online-shop-7641688
 https://nypost.com/2016/02/09/these-nuns-will-get-you-high-as-heaven/
 http://www.newsweek.com/california-nuns-seek-protection-their-cannabis-business-412062
 http://www.foxla.com/news/local-news/233313925-story

External links 
 

2010s establishments in California
Companies based in Merced County, California
Cannabis companies of the United States
Cannabis in California
2016 in cannabis
American nuns